Margaret S. Morley (née Keer, 1938–2016), was a New Zealand malacologist, illustrator and museum curator. A self-trained researcher, Morley joined the Auckland Shell Club in 1980 and became one of the leading experts in the identification of New Zealand micromollusc species. A prolific researcher, Morley published over 119 papers, most of which featured her own illustrations, and in 2004 published A Photographic Guide to Seashells of New Zealand.

Biography 

Margaret Stewart Keer was born in 1938. Morley studied physiotherapy and trained as an orthopaedic nurse. By chance became interested in marine life while volunteering with Girl Guides, after seeing a mycology display at the Auckland Easter Show. She joined the Auckland Shell Club in the late 1970s, when her children were young. In 1992 she became one of founding members of the Auckland Geology Club. Morley was a self-taught researcher, first publishing research papers in 1980. In 1993, Morley was made an Honorary Research Associate of Auckland Museum, volunteering as a research associate for over 30 years. Over this time, Morley became one of the leading experts in New Zealand micromollusc identification, and would spent at least one day per week making shoreline observations. In 1995, Morley donated a large number algae specimens for the herbarium at Auckland Museum.

In 2004, Morley published the book A Photographic Guide to Seashells of New Zealand. In 2006, Morley published the first study of New Zealand ostracod distribution ever undertaken.

In 2014, Morley became an Associate Emeritus of Auckland War Memorial Museum, due to her work in advancing the museum's marine collections, developing the museum's exhibitions and delivering public programmes.

Morley died on 12 September 2016. Of the 119 research papers Morley wrote, most included her own illustrations. She published works on marine molluscs, marine biology, geology and nudibranchs, and worked on research showing how introduced south-east Asian bivalve species had begun to dominate intertidal life in New Zealand. In July 2016 prior to her death, Morley donated her personal shell collection to the Auckland Museum, containing approximately 7,000 specimens.

Personal live 

Morley lived in Sunnyhills near Pakuranga, Auckland, close to the Tāmaki River. She was a committee member of the Tamaki Estuary Protection Society, the former director of the New Zealand College of Massage, and a commissioner for Girl Guides New Zealand.

Selected works

References

1938 births
2016 deaths
New Zealand curators
New Zealand malacologists
New Zealand marine biologists
New Zealand physiotherapists
New Zealand women nurses
New Zealand zoologists
People associated with the Auckland War Memorial Museum
Women marine biologists